Sorabora Wewa is an ancient reservoir in Mahiyangana, Badulla District Sri Lanka. It is thought to have been constructed during the reign of King Dutugemunu (161 BC – 137 BC) by a giant named Bulatha. In the ancient past, this tank was known as the 'Sea of Bintenna'.

The tank was built by damming the Diyawanna Oya with a 485-meter embankment. It does not make use of the structure called Bisokotuwa, which helps to regulate water pressure at the sluice gates from inside the tank and protect the embankment from erosion. Instead that the sluice gate (Sorowwa) of the tank has been placed strategically away from the embankment and made up utilizing the massive natural rock around the tank. It is said that this is the only such type sluice gate found in Sri Lanka.

See also
 Badulla Pillar Inscription
 List of Archaeological Protected Monuments in Badulla District

References 

Reservoirs in Sri Lanka
Bodies of water of Badulla District
Archaeological protected monuments in Badulla District
Lakes of Sri Lanka